Computing performance can mean:
 Algorithmic efficiency (software)
 Computer performance (hardware)